The 2010–11 Pakistan Premier League for professional association football, was the 7th season of the Pakistan Premier League, since its establishment in 2004, and the 56th season of Pakistan domestic league. The season began on 16 September 2010. Khan Research Laboratories were the defending champions.

WAPDA won the league, it was their 4th Premier League and 8th Pakistani league title.

WAPDA F.C. triumphed and lifted the winner's trophy in addition to Rs600,000 while the last edition's winners KRL had to be content with being runners up and Rs400,000. PIA F.C. came third and received Rs300,000. PIA shot-stopper Muhammad Haji was adjudged the Most Valuable Player (MVP) and pocketed Rs 100,000 while leading marksman Arif Mehmood and best goalkeeper Muhammad Omer (KESC F.C.) took Rs50,000 each Chaman's Afghan F.C. were given Rs100,000 as winners of the Fair Play trophy. Rs50,000 each went to the best referee Jehangir Khan and the best match commissioner Gohar Zaman while the best assistant referee Irshad-ul-Haq  received Rs25,000.

Format
Teams play each other on a home and away basis

The winners will represent Pakistan at the 2011 AFC President's Cup. The bottom two teams will be relegated to the Pakistan Football Federation League.

Location and stadia

League table

Results

Statistics

Scoring
First hat-trick of the season: Arif Mehmood for WAPDA against Young Blood (22 September 2010)
Widest winning margin: 6 goals – WAPDA Pakistan Navy 6–0 Sui Southern Gas (25 October 2010)
Most goals against one team: 6
WAPDA 6–1 Young Blood (24 September 2010)
Pakistan Navy 6–0 Sui Southern Gas (25 October 2010)
Sui Southern Gas 6–2 Young Blood (26 November 2010)
Karachi Port Trust 6–1 Young Blood (30 November 2010)
Afghan Chaman 6–1 Young Blood (25 December 2010)
Sui Southern Gas 1–6 Karachi Electric Supply Corporation (1 November 2010)
Karachi Electric Supply Corporation 6–1 Sui Southern Gas (14 November 2010)
This is the first time in the Premier League that any team has scored 6 goals against same team twice in one season.
Most hat-tricks scored by one player: 2
Arif Mehmood for WAPDA
Young Blood 0–4 WAPDA (21 September 2010)
WAPDA 6–1 Young Blood (24 September 2010)
This is the first time in the Premier League that any player has scored a hat-trick against the same team twice in one season.
Most hat-tricks by a team: 3
Karachi Electric Supply Corporation
Muhammad Essa v Sui Southern Gas (1 November 2010)
Muhammad Rasool v Afghan Chaman (8 November 2010)
Abdul Rehman v Sui Southern Gas (14 November 2010)
WAPDA
Arif Mehmood v Young Blood (21 September 2010)
Arif Mehmood v Young Blood (24 September 2010)
Khuda Bakhsh v Karachi Port Trust (22 October 2010)
Team with most goals scored: 60 goals – WAPDA
Team with fewest goals scored: 20 goals – Sui Southern Gas
Team with fewest goals conceded: 16 goals – Khan Research Laboratories
Team with most goals conceded: 73 goals – Young Blood

Top goalscorers

Hat-tricks

 4 Player scored four goals

Awards

See also
Football in Pakistan
List of football clubs in Pakistan

References

External links
 2010–11 Pakistan Premier League season at RSSSF

Pakistan Premier League seasons
1
Pakistan